Ogle is an English surname. Notable people with the surname include:

Ahmed Abdi Ogle, Kenyan politician elected to the Kenyan Parliament in 1963, 1974 and 1983
Alexander Ogle (1766–1832), American politician, father of Charles Ogle (politician) and grandfather of Andrew Jackson Ogle
Andrew Jackson Ogle (1822–1852), American politician
Benjamin Ogle (1749–1809), Governor of Maryland from 1798 to 1801
Brett Ogle (born 1964), Australian professional golfer
Catherine Ogle (born 1961), British Anglican priest, Dean of Winchester
Chaloner Ogle (1681–1750), British admiral
Sir Chaloner Ogle, 1st Baronet (1726–1816), British admiral
Sir Charles Ogle, 2nd Baronet (1775–1858), British Admiral of the Fleet
Charles Ogle (politician) (1798–1841), US Congressman
Charles Chaloner Ogle (1851–1871), British journalist
Charles Stanton Ogle (1865–1940), American silent film actor
Charles Clifford Ogle (1923–), American businessman and aviator who disappeared
Charles Ogle (racing driver) (1941–1985), American physician, businessman and NASCAR driver
Dan C. Ogle (1901–1990), American major general and third Surgeon General of the United States Air Force
David Ogle (1922–1962), British industrial and car designer
Diane Ogle (born 1965), Australian luger
George Ogle (translator) (1704–1746), English author and translator
George Ogle (1742–1814), Irish politician
John William Ogle (1824–1905), British medical doctor
June Ogle (born 1986), Guyanese cricketer
Kenneth N. Ogle (1902–1968), American scientist of human vision
Natalie Ogle (born 1960), English actress
Ponsonby Ogle (1855–1902), British writer and journalist
Ralph Ogle, 3rd Baron Ogle (1468–1512)
Robert Ogle, 1st Baron Ogle (1406–1469)
Robert Ogle (1928–1998), Canadian Catholic priest and politician
Samuel Ogle (–1752), three times Provincial Governor of Maryland
Thomas Ogle, English soldier and royalist plotter in 1643
William Ogle, 1st Viscount Ogle (died 1670), English soldier and politician

See also
Ogle family

English-language surnames